Celestia was a French black metal band from Avignon, formed in 1995 by Noktu. Noktu was the only consistent member of the band. Celestia disbanded in 2015.

Celestia remained in the demo stage until around 1999 when they released the EP A Cave Full of Bats through Drakkar Productions with a lineup consisting of Noktu (vocals, bass) and Fureïss/Franck (guitar). A few more demos, singles, split albums and a live album were done before they finally released their first studio album Apparitia - Sumptuous Spectre (2002) through Full Moon Productions with the drummer Astreyla added to the lineup. The two main members of Celestia were Noktu and Fureïss. Fureïss was the only guitarist for Celestia from 1998 to 2005, i.e. from the promo tape A Dying Out Ecstasy (1998) until the second mix of the 2002 album Apparitia Sumptuous Spectre in 2005, and he composed half the songs (the other half by Noktu) and arranged and recorded all the tracks on Celestia during this time.

The latter-day lineup was Noktu (vocals, guitar, bass) and Ghaast (guitar). With the drummer Astreyla, who had previously left the band, they recorded Celestia's second album Frigidiis Apotheosia : Abstinencia Genesiis, released in 2008 through Apparitia Records; they generally kept the same minimalistic black metal sound. Malefic (Xasthur), a guest on the album, also added some keyboards to the music. Various session drummers and guitarists were brought in for rehearsals, recordings and live shows. Noktu also owns a record label called Drakkar Productions, on which he released some of The Black Legions (a group of French underground black metal bands) albums.

Noktu also played in the band Mortifera, on guitar, bass and vocals, while Neige (Alcest) handled the drums, half of the vocals and composed tracks such as "Ciel Brouillé" and "Le Revenant". Mortifera has almost the same sound as Celestia. Also, Noktu has played in Genocide Kommando and Gestapo 666.

Discography

Demos
"Evanescence" demo (1997)
"A Dying Out Ecstasy" demo (1998)
"Infected by Rats" demo (1999)
"The Awakening of the Dormant Fiancée" demo (1999)
"Pourriture et Vermine" demo (1999)
"Dead Insecta Sequestration" demo (2001)
"Delhÿs-cätess" demo (2007)

EPs
"A Cave Full of Bats" EP (1999)
"Spectra" 7" single (2000)
"Evoking Grace and Splendour" 7" single (2002)

Albums
Apparitia - Sumptuous Spectre (2002) Full Moon Productions
Frigidiis Apotheosia : Abstinencia Genesiis (2008) Apparitia Recordings
Archaenae Perfectii (2010) Apparitia Recordings
Aetherra (2017) Drakkar Productions

Live albums
Under the Reign of Terror and Tyranny (1999)

Split albums and collaborations
Split with Draugwath (1998)
Split with Inferno (1999)
French-Southern Black Metal War split with Evil (1999)
Darkness Enfold the Sky/Black Slaughterization split with Goatfire (2001)

Best of/compilations
A Cave Full of Bats best of (2002)
Crucified Dead Flesh (2003)
Dead Insecta Sequestraton (2003)

References

External links
 Official Celestia website
 Celestia MySpace Homepage
 Celestia on Encyclopaedia Metallum

French black metal musical groups
Musical groups established in 1995
French musical duos
Musical groups from Provence-Alpes-Côte d'Azur